This is a list of Cuban Academy Award winners and nominees. This list details the performances of Cuban filmmakers, actors, actresses and films that have either been submitted, nominated or have won an Academy Award.

Acting

Best Actress

Best Supporting Actor

Best Original Song

Best International Feature Film

This list focuses on Cuban films that won or were nominated for the Best International Feature Film award.

See also

 Cinema of Cuba
 List of Cuban films

Cuba
Cinema of Cuba